Proprioseius is a genus of mites in the Phytoseiidae family.

Species
 Proprioseius aculeatus Moraes & Denmark, 1999
 Proprioseius anthurus Denmark & Muma, 1966
 Proprioseius clancyi Chant, 1957
 Proprioseius gibbus Moraes & Denmark, 1999
 Proprioseius kumaonensis Gupta, 1982
 Proprioseius meridionalis Chant, 1957
 Proprioseius mirandai De Leon, 1959
 Proprioseius oudemansi (Chant, 1959)
 Proprioseius retroacuminatus Zacarias & Moraes, 2001
 Proprioseius schichai Corpuz-Raros, 1994

References

Phytoseiidae